George Waldegrave, 5th Earl Waldegrave (13 July 1784–29 June 1794) was the son of the 4th Earl Waldegrave and his wife, Elizabeth Waldegrave, Countess Waldegrave.

Upon his father's death in 1789, he inherited his titles at the age of five but drowned whilst swimming in the River Thames near Eton in 1794, a week before his tenth birthday. His titles then passed to his brother, John.

Ancestry

References

External links
Stirnet: Waldegrave1 

1784 births
1794 deaths
People from Mendip District
People from Somerset
Accidental deaths in England
Deaths by drowning in the United Kingdom
Earls Waldegrave
Waldegrave family
Royalty and nobility who died as children